Pavan Ravishankar (born 28 June 1999) is a racing driver from Singapore.

Career

BRDC British Formula 3 Championship

Ravishankar started his British F3 career started in 2017 where he raced for Double R Racing at the final round at Donington Park where he finished 10th twice. In 2018 Ravishankar stayed with Double R Racing and raced the whole season alongside Krishnaraaj Mahadik and Linus Lundqvist, he finished on the podium twice one of which being a win at Silverstone. Ravishankar scored 153 points meaning he finished 15th in the standings. For the third season in a row Ravishankar partnered with Double R to race in the 2019 BRDC British Formula 3 Championship, the Singaporean's best result was his only podium where he finished 3rd behind Benjamin Pedersen and Johnathan Hoggard. For the second time Ravishankar finished 15th in the table 323 points behind champion Clément Novalak.

Racing record

Career summary

References

External links
 

1999 births
Living people
Singaporean racing drivers
F3 Asian Championship drivers
Asian Formula Renault Challenge drivers
MRF Challenge Formula 2000 Championship drivers
BRDC British Formula 3 Championship drivers
Double R Racing drivers
Hitech Grand Prix drivers
Chinese F4 Championship drivers
BlackArts Racing drivers